Dahaneh-ye Tavarkan is a village in Kuh Shah Rural District, Ahmadi District, Hajjiabad County, Hormozgan Province, Iran. At the time of the 2006 census, ten families lived in the village, which had a total population of 44.

References 

Populated places in Hajjiabad County